Rajesh Singh is a Fijian politician of Indian descent, who briefly held Cabinet office in mid-2006.

Career
A protégé of Ratu Inoke Takiveikata, the Qaranivalu (Paramount Chief) of Naitasiri Province, Singh was one of only two Indo-Fijians elected on the ticket of the ruling Soqosoqo Duavata ni Lewenivanua (SDL) Party of Prime Minister Laisenia Qarase, when he won the Cunningham Open Constituency at the Parliamentary election held on 6–13 March 2006. In the previous election, held in 2001, he had attempted to win the Ra Open Constituency for the predominantly Indian National Federation Party.
Rajesh Singh Uncles were late Hon James Shankar Singh and Hon Uday Singh Alliance Party with Late Ratu Mara government.
He is 3rd generation of Singh in Fiji Politics. 
Singh are very respected persons from Ba.

Soon after the 2006 election, Singh was appointed Minister of State for Youth and Sports. In this role he was subordinate to Ro Teimumu Kepa, with whom his working relationship was tense. Fiji Television reported on 28 September that Kepa had written to the Prime Minister a week earlier, charging that Singh was failing to cooperate with her. When he started publicly querying what he said were discrepancies in the accounts of the Sports Ministry and especially the Fiji Sports Council. He was dismissed on 13 October 2006. Takiveikata, imprisoned for his role in a mutiny linked to the 2000 coup, had attempted to persuade Qarase to retain Singh, according to a Fiji Television report on 8 October, but to no avail.

Following the military coup which deposed the Qarase government on 5 December 2006, Singh declared his willingness to cooperate with the new regime. Fiji Live quoted him on 17 December as saying that he supported the stated intention of the Military to purge corruption and irregularities from the government and bureaucracy.

On 26 May 2007 Singh told Fiji television that he had resigned from the SDL and wished to contest the next election, but not for his former party.

References 

Soqosoqo Duavata ni Lewenivanua politicians
Indian members of the House of Representatives (Fiji)
Living people
Fijian Latter Day Saints
Politicians from Naitasiri Province
Politicians from Suva
Year of birth missing (living people)